Sant Pere, Santa Caterina i la Ribera is a neighborhood in the Ciutat Vella district of Barcelona, Catalonia (Spain). It is formed by the former neighborhoods of Sant Pere, Santa Caterina and la Ribera. The southeastern part of this area, just below Carrer de la Princesa, and leading to Barceloneta, is often referred to as "El Born."

A close subway stop for many staying in this neighborhood is Jaume I (primer), which is situated on the yellow L4 line.